Árnadóttir is an Icelandic patronymic, used by:

Ásta Árnadóttir (born 1983), Icelandic former footballer who was a defender
Bergþóra Árnadóttir (1948–2007), Icelandic folk song composer and singer
Guðbjörg Aradóttir, Icelandic entomologist 
Halla Margrét Árnadóttir (born 1964), Icelandic singer, represented Iceland in the Eurovision Song Contest 1987
Nína Björk Árnadóttir (1941–2000), Icelandic playwright, poet, and novelist
Ragna Árnadóttir (born 1966), Icelandic lawyer and former Minister of Justice and Ecclesiastical Affairs of Iceland
Ragnheiður Elín Árnadóttir (born 1967), Icelandic politician, the Minister of Industry and Commerce since 23 May 2013

Icelandic-language surnames